Kevin Milne is a Scottish professional football player and coach, who is currently the manager of East of Scotland Football League club Musselburgh Athletic. As a player, he was a defender for Aberdeen, Stirling Albion and Forfar Athletic, and represented Scotland at youth level. He has managed Hawick Royal Albert in the Scottish Lowland Football League and Hibernian Ladies in the Scottish Women's Premier League.

Club career 
Milne started his career at Aberdeen after leaving St Davids High School in 1997. He was a regular for both reserves and youth team and making 2 appearances for the first team. His appearances came against Inverness Caledonian Thistle F.C. and Celtic.

He played under Roy Aitken, Alex Miller, Paul Hegarty before being released by Ebbe Skovdahl in the summer of 2000. Milne then signed for Stirling Albion F.C. in season 2000–2001 in which the side got relegated to division 3. Milne left in the summer of 2001 and signed for Forfar Athletic F.C. where he was reunited with former Aberdeen F.C. youth team coach Neil Cooper until his departure in 2003. Following his departure in 2003, Milne signed for Linlithgow Rose and finishing his career at Haddington.

Coaching career 
Milne started his coaching career at Heart of Midlothian F.C. Ladies in 2012 and in his first season Hearts gained promotion to division 1. In 2014 he was in charge when they gained promotion to the top tier in the SWPL 1. Milne left Hearts to become coach at Hibernian L.F.C. where they won league cup and Scottish cup. In the same season Hibernian L.F.C. where to progress to the last 32 of UEFA Women's Champions League where they faced FC Bayern Munich (women) where they lost 10–1 on aggregate.

In February 2017, Milne was appointed as manager of Scottish Lowland Football League team Hawick Royal Albert F.C. He guided the team to safety in the Lowland League, then resigned from his post in May 2017. Milne was then assistant manager at SJFA East Super League club Penicuik, before returning to Hibernian Ladies as head coach in October 2017. He left this position in March 2018.

Milne was appointed as manager of East of Scotland League club Musselburgh Athletic in June 2021.

References

1981 births
Living people
Footballers from Edinburgh
Aberdeen F.C. players
Stirling Albion F.C. players
Forfar Athletic F.C. players
Scottish football managers
Scottish footballers
Linlithgow Rose F.C. players
Hibernian W.F.C. managers
Association football defenders
Scottish Women's Premier League managers
Scottish Junior Football Association players
Scottish Football League players
Heart of Midlothian W.F.C. managers
Hawick Royal Albert F.C. managers
Penicuik Athletic F.C. managers
Musselburgh Athletic F.C. managers